Guillermo Alcaide and Adrián Menéndez won the title, defeating Leonardo Tavares and Simone Vagnozzi 6–2, 6–1 in the final.

Seeds

  Leonardo Tavares /  Simone Vagnozzi (final)
  Alessio di Mauro /  Alessandro Motti (first round)
  Gerard Granollers /  Guillermo Olaso (quarterfinals)
  Andrea Arnaboldi /  Martin Kližan (quarterfinals)

Draw

Draw

External links
 Main draw

2011 Doubles
Casablanca,Doubles